Sudbury railway station may refer to:
Sudbury railway station in Suffolk, England
Sudbury & Harrow Road railway station in London, England
Sudbury Hill tube station in London, England
Sudbury Hill Harrow railway station in London, England
Sudbury railway station (Staffordshire) in England (closed 1966)
Sudbury station (Ontario) in Greater Sudbury, Ontario, Canada
Sudbury Junction station in Greater Sudbury, Ontario, Canada
Sudbury Town tube station in London, England
Wembley Central station, previously named Sudbury; Sudbury and Wembley and Wembley for Sudbury